Constantin Bălăceanu-Stolnici (born 6 July 1923) is a Romanian neurologist.

He was born in Bucharest, the descendant of al old boyar family. He studied at the Ion C. Brătianu High School in Pitești, graduating in 1941. He then practiced medicine at several hospitals in Bucharest, including Colentina (1952–1957), Dr. Cantacuzino (1957–1965), and Gheorghe Marinescu (1965–1970).

Beginning in 1974, Bălăceanu-Stolnici collaborated as an informant of the Securitate secret police of the communist regime. Operating under the code names "Paul Ionescu" and "Laurențiu", he was a prolific informer, as well as an agent of influence and agent provocateur for the Securitate. In 2007, Cotidianul published informative notes sent by Bălăceanu-Stolnici to the Securitate, which included a sketch of Vlad Georgescu's Munich apartment, drawn after a visit to his place in October 1984; these notes might have helped in the presumed assassination by irradiation of this Radio Free Europe journalist.

After the fall of communism, he was elected an honorary member of the Romanian Academy in 1992. In 2003, President Ion Iliescu awarded him the Order of the Star of Romania, Knight rank.

Publications

Notes

External links

1923 births
Living people
Physicians from Bucharest
Boyars
Romanian neurologists
Carol Davila University of Medicine and Pharmacy alumni
Securitate informants
Honorary members of the Romanian Academy
Knights of the Order of the Star of Romania